Michael Davidson (born 3 September 1992) is a New Zealand cricketer who plays for Canterbury. He made his first-class debut on 13 February 2016 in the 2015–16 Plunket Shield. He made his List A debut on 27 December 2015 in the 2015–16 Ford Trophy.

References

External links
 

1992 births
Living people
New Zealand cricketers
Canterbury cricketers
Cricketers from Christchurch